Christians in Bahrain make up about 14.5% of the population. Bahrain has had a native Christian community for many centuries, with the first recorded presence dating back to the 12th century. Expatriate Christians, however, make up the majority of Christians in Bahrain, while local Christian Bahrainis (who hold Bahraini citizenship) make up a much smaller community. Alees Samaan, the former Bahraini ambassador to the United Kingdom, is a native Christian.

Bahraini Christians
Christians who hold Bahraini citizenship number approximately 1,000. The majority of the Christians are originally from Iraq, Palestine and Jordan, with a small minority having lived in Bahrain for many centuries; the majority have been living as Bahraini citizens for less than a century. There are also smaller numbers of native Christians who originally hail from Lebanon, Syria, and India.

The majority of Christian Bahraini citizens tend to be Orthodox Christians, with the largest church by membership being the Eastern Orthodox Church. They enjoy many equal religious and social freedoms. Bahrain has Christian members in the Bahraini government. Bahrain is one of two GCC countries to have a native Christian population; the other country, Kuwait, also has Christian population but in smaller numbers, with less than 400 Christian Kuwaiti citizens.

Eastern Orthodox Christians in Bahrain traditionally belong to the jurisdiction of Eastern Orthodox Patriarchate of Antioch and All the East. An Eastern Orthodox parish in Bahrain was organized in 2000 by late metropolitan Constantine Papastephanou of Baghdad and Kuwait (1969-2014), who also had ecclesiastical jurisdiction over Eastern Orthodox in Bahrain and the United Arab Emirates.

Expatriate Christians
Foreign citizens who live and work in Bahrain make up the majority of Christians in Bahrain. They include people from Europe, North and South America, Africa, Asia, and the Middle East. They belong to various Catholic, Orthodox, and Protestant churches.

Notable Bahraini Christians
Alees Samaan - Former Bahraini ambassador to the United Kingdom.
Hani Aziz - Pastor of the Arabic Congregation of the National Evangelical Church in Bahrain
Hala Qurisa  - Second Deputy Chairman of the Shura Council.

Camillo Ballin, Italian-Bahraini Bishop

Selected churches

Sacred Heart Church (Manama, Bahrain) - Catholic
St. Mary's Orthodox Church - Indian Orthodox 
St. Peter's Jacobite Syrian Orthodox Church
The Mar Thoma Church & St. Paul's Marthoma Church
Saar Fellowship 
Indian Pentecostal Church of God Bahrain
IPC SHALOM Bahrain
House of Praise Community Church 
St. Christopher's Cathedral - Anglican
The National Evangelical Church 
The Father's House AG Church
The Bahrain Malayalee Church of South India

See also 
 Roman Catholicism in Bahrain
 Sacred Heart Church (Manama, Bahrain)
 Christians in Bahrain (historical region)
 Christianity in the Middle East
 Arab Christians

Notes

References

Further reading

External links
St Christopher’s Cathedral and Awali Anglican Church

The Father's House AG Church

The House of Praise Community Church